Carlingford was a constituency represented in the Irish House of Commons to 1801.

History
In the Patriot Parliament of 1689 summoned by King James II, Carlingford was represented with two members.

Members of Parliament
1559: John Neill and Sir Henry Radclyffe
1585: Robert Neill and Rice ap Hugh
1613–1615: Marmaduke Whitechurch and Sir Roger Hope
1634–1635: John Travers and Joshua Carpenter 
1639–1643: Joshua Carpenter (died and replaced 1642 by Chichester Fortescue) and Bernard Saunders  (Fortescue and Saunders both died in office 1642)
1643–1649 Edward Trevor and Edmund Keating 
1661–1666: Sir George Rawdon, 1st Baronet and Edward Vernon

1689–1801

Notes

References

Bibliography

Historic constituencies in County Louth
Constituencies of the Parliament of Ireland (pre-1801)
1800 disestablishments in Ireland
Constituencies disestablished in 1800
Carlingford, County Louth